The Brazil-Peru Integration Bridge is a bridge that crosses the Acre River at a point which forms the international border between Peru and Brazil. The bridge is part of highway BR-317, and connects the Peruvian city Iñapari to the Brazilian city Assis Brasil. The bridge is very close to the Bolivian city Bolpebra.

Gallery

Suspension bridges in Brazil
Bridges in Peru